Ho (or the transliterations He or Heo) may refer to:

People

Language and ethnicity
 Ho people, an ethnic group of India
 Ho language, a tribal language in India
 Hani people, or Ho people, an ethnic group in China, Laos and Vietnam
 Hiri Motu, ISO 639-1 language code ho
Ho (Armenian letter), a letter of the Armenian script

Names
 Ho (Korean name), a family name, given name, and an element in two-syllable given names
 Heo, also romanised as Hŏ, a Korean family name
 Hồ (surname), a Vietnamese surname 
 He (surname), or Ho, the romanised transliteration of several Chinese family names
 Hè (surname) ,  also romanised as Ho, a Chinese surname

People with the surname
 Adrianne Ho, Canadian model, designer, and businesswoman
 Cassey Ho (born 1987), American social media fitness entrepreneur
 Coco Ho (born 1991), American surfer
 Derek Ho (1964—2020), Hawaiian surfer
 Don Ho (1930–2007), American musician
 Ho Chi Minh (1890–1969), Vietnamese political leader
 Michael Ho (born 1957), American surfer
 Sornsawan Ho (born 1993), Thai member of the Scout Movement

Places
 Ho, Denmark
 Ho Municipal, a district in Ghana
 Ho, Ghana
 Ho Airport

Science and technology
 Tasmanian Herbarium, Index herbariorum code HO
 ho. also known as ho-mobile, an Italian telecommunications company owned by Vodafone Omnitel N.V.
 Holmium, symbol Ho, a chemical element
 Hoxnian (Ho I to Ho IV), a stage of the geological history of the British Isles
 Hydroxyl radical, •OH, chemical formula HO 
 Heterotopic ossification, a process by which bone tissue forms outside of the skeleton

Other uses 
 Ho!, a 1968 French-Italian crime film 
 Hō (EP), a 2001 EP by Maximum the Hormone
 Ho (kana), a part of the Japanese writing system
 Handelsorganisation, a state-owned retail business of the former German Democratic Republic
 Head office, or headquarters
 HO scale, a rail transport modelling scale 
 Antinea Airlines, a former Algerian airline, IATA airline code HO
 Juneyao Airlines, a Chinese airline, IATA airline code HO
 Slang for a whore or sexually loose woman

See also
 
 
 Hoe (disambiguation)
 Hoo (disambiguation)
 Hou (disambiguation)
 Hồ (disambiguation)
 Hu, a Chinese surname
Ho Hos, chocolate snack cakes
Ho ho ho (disambiguation)

Language and nationality disambiguation pages